Lavkushnagar, formerly known as Laundi and Lavpuri, is a town/tehshil and a nagar panchayat in Chhatarpur district in the Indian state of Madhya Pradesh. The Urmil and Kail Rivers flow through this town. The Civil Airport Khajuraho and Dumra, Harpalpur, and Khajuraho Railway Station are located nearby, and links it to some major towns and cities of Madhya Pradesh. It also has a Civil Court, a Sub Jail, and a police station.

Lavkushnagar is a proposed district by citizen and district headquarters will be in lavkushnagar, chhatarpur, Madhya Pradesh, India.Lavkushnagar, is surrounded by many mountains. The tallest mountain is Mata Bambar Baini Temple mountain. To reach the top of the mountain there are approximately 350–380 stairs

Demographics
 India census, Laundi had a population of 20,186. Males constitute 54% of the population and females 46%. Laundi has an average literacy rate of 61%, higher than the national average of 59.5%: male literacy is 69%, and female literacy is 52%. In Laundi, 16% of the population is under six years of ago.

Geography 

Lavkushnagar, is surrounded by many mountains. The tallest mountain is Mata Bambar Baini Temple mountain. To reach the top of the mountain there are approximately 350–380 stairs.

Places to visit
The temple of Mata Bambar Baini is located on a hill in Lavkushnagar.
Mata Anjini Mandir (Temple) behind boys higher secondary school
 Santoshi mata temple near bus stand 
 Durga mata temple near new bus stand, irrigation colony lavkushnagar
 Gayatri mandir (Temple) second largest and well maintained gaytri mandir of chhatarpur disst.
 Major tourist attractions in the vicinity include Ken Gharial Sanctuary, Pandava Waterfall, and Shilpgram, which are easily accessible from Lavkushnagar.
Famous Temple Of Jhinnan Hanuman Ji is Location Mahoba Road Lavkush Nagar
 Pankaj park is location chandla road Lavkush Nagar

 Swami vivekanand Park is located in Old bus stand ( Midpoint of LK City )

Speciality

The only Republic Fair of the country is planned every year on Republic Day of India (26 January) in Lavkushnagar .

The organization of this fair was initiated by the honorable freedom fighter and former chairman - Shri Ram Singh Parihar ji (Nanna ji) .

Transport
Nearest civil airport Khajuraho
Nearest railway stations Dumra, Khajuraho, Mahoba, Harpalpur

See also
 Laundi College
 Government excilence school
 Govt Model H S School Lavkushnagar
 Police station
 Government girls higher secoundry school
 Modern public school lavkushnagar
 Disha net Point lavkushnagar
 Civil Court Lavkushnagar

References

Bundelkhand
Chhatarpur